"The Party's Just Begun" is the lead single from the soundtrack of The Cheetah Girls 2.

Background and composition 
The single officially premiered on Radio Disney on June 5, 2006 and was released officially for digital download on July 11. The song was written and produced by Matthew Gerrard and Robbie Nevil. The single debuted at #94 and peaked #85 on The
Billboard Hot 100, making it their first song to chart.

Vocals 
The recorded version of the song featured Raven-Symoné on lead vocals, with adlibs by Adrienne Bailon and background vocals by Sabrina Bryan and Kiely Williams. All the girls have 4 solo verses on the song. Due to Symoné's absences, Bryan and Williams took her verses. Both Bailon and Williams sing the chorus with background vocals by Bryan. Symoné joined the girls to perform the song live on Good Morning America, being the first and only time all four girls sing live together.

Ming Remix 
The official remix of the song, known as the "Ming Remix" was released on February 10, 2009 as a promo single. It was previously released on the EP format of the original version of "The Party's Just Begun". This version of "The Party's Just Begun" not featured on any album(s) of The Cheetah Girls.

Music video 
The video for the song features the performance of "The Party's Just Begun" in the movie with clips from the movie intercut throughout the video. It premiered on June 22, 2006 on Disney Channel.

Track listing 
 U.S. CD single/U.K CD single
 "The Party's Just Begun - 3:10
 "Strut (Remix)" - 2:55

 U.K. Digital download
 "The Party's Just Begun" - 3:10

Italy EP
 "The Party's Just Begun - 3:10
 "Strut (remix)" - 3:12
 "The Party's Just Begun (Ming Remix)" - 3:04

Charts

Release details

References 

Songs about parties
American contemporary R&B songs
2006 singles
American dance-pop songs
The Cheetah Girls songs
Songs written for films
Songs written by Matthew Gerrard
Songs written by Robbie Nevil
Walt Disney Records singles
Song recordings produced by Robbie Nevil
2006 songs
Song recordings produced by Matthew Gerrard